Rockabilly Riot!: All Original is the ninth solo studio album by American musician Brian Setzer, released on August 12, 2014.
The album features 12 new songs, including "Let's Shake", a single released by Setzer earlier in 2014.

Track listing

Personnel
Brian Setzer - vocals, guitar
Mark W. Winchester - bass
Kevin McKendree - piano
Noah Levy - drums
Chris Pelcer - Calliope organ on "Calamity Jane"
Paul Franklin - pedal steel guitar on "The Girl with the Blues in her Eyes"
Joey Nardone - backing vocals  on "Blue Lights, Big City"

Charts

References 

2014 albums
Brian Setzer albums
Albums produced by Peter Collins (record producer)
Surfdog Records albums